Marcello Nicolin Piedt (born 23 September 1992) is a young South African bowler representing the South Western Districts. Piedt was called up to the SA Schools team in 2011 and has represented South Western Districts since the U13 levels. He is also a member of the Warriors Cubs franchise. He took 10–5–6–7 against Western Province on first-class debut in October 2012, and finished with 59 wickets, a record for a South African debut season. He was included in the South Western Districts cricket team squad for the 2015 Africa T20 Cup.

He was the leading wicket-taker in the 2017–18 Sunfoil 3-Day Cup for South Western Districts, with 31 dismissals in ten matches.

In September 2018, he was named in South Western Districts' squad for the 2018 Africa T20 Cup. He was the leading wicket-taker for South Western Districts in the 2018–19 CSA 3-Day Provincial Cup, with 35 dismissals in eight matches. In April 2021, he was named in South Western Districts' squad, ahead of the 2021–22 cricket season in South Africa.

References

External links
 

1992 births
Living people
People from Oudtshoorn
South African cricketers
South Western Districts cricketers
Eastern Province cricketers
Cricketers from the Western Cape